The Meditation Singers was a Gospel music group formed by Ernestine Rundless in the late 1940s. The original members were Earnestine Rundless, DeLillian Mitchell, Marie Waters, and Waters sister, Deloreese Early, who of course is now known as Della Reese.  Della Reese left the group in 1953 and was replaced by Laura Lee, Rundless's daughter.

References 

American gospel musical groups
Musical groups established in the 1940s